"Roxanne" (stylized in all uppercase) is a song by American rapper and singer Arizona Zervas. It was released on October 10, 2019. The song was written by the artist himself with Lauren Larue, and produced by 94Skrt and Jae Green. It reached number one in New Zealand and peaked within the top ten in Australia, Norway, the UK, and the US. It reached the Top 40 in many other European and North American markets, including number four on the Billboard Hot 100. The success of the song sparked a bidding war among labels, and on November 15, 2019, it was reported that Zervas had signed with Columbia Records. A remix with American singer and rapper Swae Lee was released on February 21, 2020.

Background and release
Zervas teased the release of the song by posting a clip of him dancing to the song on his Instagram a day prior to the release. The song was released on October 10, 2019. The track quickly became a viral hit on the app TikTok. Within the first three weeks, the song reached the Top 50 of the US Spotify and several iTunes charts. Due to the sudden success of the song, it was added to Spotify's Today's Top Hits playlist in late October 2019. However, Billboard reported that only 28% of Zervas' Spotify streams come from playlists. It topped Spotify's US song chart from November 7–13 with more than one million streams daily, making Zervas the first unsigned, independent artist to achieve that feat. The song's success landed him a deal with Columbia Records, marking Columbia's second major signing of a viral star in 2019 following the label's deal with Lil Nas X, thanks to his breakout hit "Old Town Road". Since the release and success of "Roxanne", the singer has gone from having just over 500,000 monthly Spotify listeners to nearly 31 million listeners as of January 2020.

Chart performance
"Roxanne" became the first track by an unsigned, fully independent artist to top the Spotify chart since the beginning of 2017. The song subsequently debuted at number 34 on the US Billboard Hot 100, as well as debuting at number 24 on the UK Singles Chart and reaching number 1 in New Zealand, becoming his first number one on any national chart. It has so far peaked at number four in the US, where it also topped the Billboard Streaming Songs chart for the week dated November 30, 2019, making Zervas just the fourth artist to top the chart with their first charting song. The song also reached number two on the Mainstream Top 40 chart for two weeks, behind Dua Lipa's "Don't Start Now".

Critical reception
Billboard described the song as "an instantly memorable pop-rap concoction with an attention-grabbing intro, a sing-along chorus and about an album's worth of addicting mini-hooks." Chris Lambert of Forbes compared Zervas' "smooth, dreamy flow" on the song to the likes of Migos and Post Malone. Elias Leight at Rolling Stone noted that the singer "likes to stretch syllables and add a light quaver to his vocals" and how the song "sounds like a Post Malone demo".

Music video
An official music video, directed by Nicholas Jandora, was released on February 12, 2020. It references 90s films Groundhog Day, Pulp Fiction and Trainspotting, and early 2000s films Kill Bill and 50 First Dates.

Background and concept 
The video finds Zervas stuck in an "infinite loop" where he dies every day, only to wake up again the next morning, while "Roxanne" channels Uma Thurman's Mia Wallace character from Pulp Fiction. Zervas came up with the video's concept, with Columbia Records vice president of video production Saul Levitz noting how Zervas was "very specific" of how the character of Roxanne needed to be portrayed: "a conceptual hook with her constantly being this source of bad luck and him being stuck in this perpetual ride with her". The video features "colorful fashion and antiquated housing" while capturing a "vintage California aesthetic". Considering the song's popularity on TikTok, Levitz said they wanted the video to engage the audience in a new way and with that, wanted to uncover some mystery about Zervas, noting how Zervas had no previous videos and "people didn't even have many still photos of him".

Credits and personnel
Credits adapted from Tidal.

 Arizona Zervas – associated performer, composer, lyricist
 Lauren Larue – composer, lyricist
 94Skrt – producer, recording engineer
 Jae Green – producer
 Manny Marroquin – mixing engineer
 Chris Gehringer – mastering engineer

Charts

Weekly charts

Year-end charts

Certifications

Release history

References

2019 singles
2019 songs
Columbia Records singles
Number-one singles in New Zealand
Pop-rap songs